This page details the qualifying process for the 1988 African Cup of Nations in Morocco. Morocco, as hosts, and Egypt, as title holders, qualified automatically.

Qualifying tournament
 qualified as holders
 qualified as hosts

Preliminary round

|}

Guinea won 3–1 on aggregate.

Uganda won 5–0 on aggregate.

Angola won 5–3 on penalty shootout after 1–1 on aggregate.

Congo won 7–2 on aggregate.

Sierra Leone won 3–2 on aggregate.

Tanzania advanced after Ethiopia withdrew.

Madagascar advanced after Mauritius withdrew.

Rwanda advanced after Lesotho withdrew.

Togo advanced after Equatorial Guinea withdrew.

Tunisia advanced after Mali withdrew.

First round

|}

Algeria won 2–1 on aggregate.

Kenya won 3–2 on aggregate.

Nigeria won 3–1 on aggregate.

Cameroon won 6–4 on aggregate.

Ivory Coast won 4–1 on aggregate.

Zimbabwe won 4–3 on aggregate.

Senegal won 4–0 on aggregate.

Sudan won 2–1 on aggregate.

Zaire won 3–1 on aggregate.

Sierra Leone won 2–1 on aggregate.

Libya advanced after Zambia withdrew.

Malawi advanced after Rwanda withdrew.

Second round

|}

Ivory Coast won 4–1 on aggregate.

Nigeria won 3–2 on aggregate.

Cameroon won 2–1 on aggregate.

Kenya won by away goals rule after 1–1 on aggregate.

Zaire won 4–2 on penalty shootout after 0–0 on aggregate.

Algeria advanced after Libya withdrew.

Qualified teams

References

External links
 African Nations Cup 1988
 International Matches 1987 – Africa
 International Matches 1988 – Africa

1988
qualification
Qual